The Victory Day is a public holiday in Azerbaijan that is celebrated on 8 November, in commemoration of Azerbaijan being the victor in the 2020 Nagorno-Karabakh war. Established by the decree of the President of Azerbaijan, dated 2 December 2020, the holiday is celebrated on the day of the recapture of Shusha. It is a non-working holiday.

Background 

On 27 September 2020, clashes broke out in the disputed Nagorno-Karabakh region, which is de facto controlled by the self-proclaimed and unrecognized Republic of Artsakh, but de jure part of Azerbaijan. Azerbaijani forces first advanced in Fuzuli and Jabrayil districts, taking their respective administrative centres. From there, they proceeded towards Hadrut. Azerbaijani troops began to advance more intensively after the fall of Hadrut around 15 October, and Armenians began to retreat, with Azerbaijanis then taking control of Zangilan and Qubadli. Launching an offensive for Lachin, they also penetrated into Shusha District through its forests and mountain passes.

Following the capture of Shusha, the second-largest settlement in Nagorno-Karabakh, a ceasefire agreement was signed between the President of Azerbaijan, Ilham Aliyev, the Prime Minister of Armenia, Nikol Pashinyan, and the President of Russia, Vladimir Putin, ending all hostilities in the area from 00:00, 10 November 2020 Moscow Time. Under the agreement, the warring sides will keep control of their currently held areas within Nagorno-Karabakh, while Armenia will return the surrounding territories it occupied in 1994 to Azerbaijan. Azerbaijan will also gain land access to its Nakhchivan exclave bordering Turkey and Iran. Approximately 2,000 Russian soldiers will be deployed as peacekeeping forces along the Lachin corridor between Armenia and Nagorno-Karabakh for a mandate of at least five years.

Institution of the holiday 
On 2 December 2020, the President of Azerbaijan, Ilham Aliyev, signed a decree on the establishment of Victory Day as a public holiday in Azerbaijan. The day of the signing of the ceasefire agreement ending the war, and its entry into force by Azerbaijan Time, 10 November, was to be celebrated in Azerbaijan as the Victory Day. The next day, this order was cancelled. The holiday's celebration date was changed to 8 November, the day the Azerbaijani forces seized control Shusha, as the previous date overlapped with Mustafa Kemal Atatürk's Memorial Day in Turkey. On 8 December, It was announced that a new station of the Baku Metro's Purple Line (B3) will be named "November 8" at the suggestion of Aliyev.

See also 
 Memorial Day (Azerbaijan)
 Public holidays in Azerbaijan
 Shushi Liberation Day

References 

Public holidays in Azerbaijan
2020 establishments in Azerbaijan
Aftermath of the 2020 Nagorno-Karabakh war
Victory days
Military of Azerbaijan
November observances
Autumn events in Azerbaijan